Forth is a barony in County Carlow, Republic of Ireland.

Etymology
Forth takes its name from the Irish Fortuatha, a term that described a region (tuath) not ruled by members of the dominant dynasty of a province. In this case, the region was known as Fothairt Mag Feá, "the fothairt of the plain of beeches."

Location

Forth is found in the eastern part of County Carlow. Physical features include the Burren River and Mount Leinster.

Forth barony is bordered to the east by St. Mullin's Upper; to the north by Rathvilly; to the west by Idrone East; to the northwest by Carlow (all the preceding baronies are also in County Carlow); to the northeast by Shillelagh, County Wicklow; and to the southeast by Scarawalsh, County Wexford.

History
Uí Nualláin (O'Nolan) were rulers of Fothairt Mag Feá.

List of settlements
Below is a list of settlements in Forth barony:
Aghade
Ballon
Myshall

References

Baronies of County Carlow